Walden Galleria is a regional shopping mall located in Cheektowaga, a suburb of Buffalo, New York located east of Interstate 90 and New York State Thruway Exit 52 off Walden Avenue. The Galleria is currently anchored by the traditional chains Macy's, JCPenney, Dick's Sporting Goods, Best Buy, DSW Shoe Warehouse, Forever 21, Old Navy, and a Regal Cinemas multiplex. As of 2022, Walden Galleria is the Buffalo-Niagara region's top shopping, dining, and entertainment destination. In 2021, Walden Galleria was listed among the top 20 most visited shopping centers in America, attracting over 23 million visitors from the United States and Canada. The mall is owned and managed by The Pyramid Companies of Syracuse, New York, the same management firm which developed it.

History
Walden Galleria was developed by The Pyramid Companies, an Upstate New York-based shopping center development and management firm. Built on a site near Exit 52 of the New York State Thruway, the mall was opened in 1989. The mall featured a range of upscale and traditional anchors, Bonwit Teller, L.L.Berger, The Sample, AM&A's, Sibley's, JCPenney, and Sears. At the time, the mall featured more than 150 stores, as well as a theater owned by Hoyts Cinemas.

An additional anchor space was built for Lord & Taylor in 1990.

1990s
During 1990, storied regional division Sibley's became Pittsburgh, Pennsylvania-based Kaufmann's. In 1995, York, Pennsylvania-based department store chain The Bon-Ton acquired the AM&A's chain, converting all branches to The Bon-Ton. Later that year, on December 14, 17-year-old Cynthia Wiggins of Buffalo was struck by a dump truck while trying to get to her first day of work in the mall's food court from a NFTA Metro bus stop on Walden Avenue. The incident sparked allegations from Buffalo's African-American community that Pyramid did not want people from Buffalo's predominantly minority East Side to have easy access to the mall. In settling a wrongful death claim against Walden Galleria and NFTA Metro and to prevent a boycott of the mall, the bus stop was soon moved to a point inside the mall, where it remains today. 
 In 1996, sporting apparel retailer Finish Line opened one of its largest stores.
Montgomery Ward, which acquired the Lechmere chain in 1994, closed the Lechmere stores nationwide in 1998, as part of a corporate restructuring. After its closure, Lechmere converted to JCPenney Home and a DSW Shoe Warehouse. In 1999, Kaufmann's also opened a home store within the mall.

2000s
As the new millennium arrived, so did several exciting developments. A  Pottery Barn and Upstate NY's first Apple Store which would occupy  in front of the Bon Ton and Forever 21, a junior clothing store, who opened an  store on the mall's first floor. Also joining the mall was Abercrombie & Fitch and Hollister, the latter of which was the first location in Western New York. In 2001, a brand-new Galyan's Trading Company store was added to the mall.

By 2002, General Cinemas had sold the mall's theater complex to AMC Theatres. In 2004, the Galyan’s location was rebranded to Dick's Sporting Goods following the latter’s acquisition of the former. In 2006, The Bon-Ton closed its store at the mall. In September 2006, Kaufmann's was rebranded to Macy’s after Macy’s merged with the parent company of Kaufmann’s.

2007 Expansion
Plans were announced to expand Walden Galleria by razing the recently-shuttered The Bon-Ton to make way for a wing for additional stores, anchored by a 16-screen Regal Cinemas multiplex on the upper level. An existing exterior entrance with escalators and an elevator going up to the food court was removed and the large exterior glass wall was temporarily blocked off with the intention of creating a Barnes and Noble store in front of that space that would open up to the food court. However, that location became Dave and Buster's instead due complications in the construction of Barnes and Noble's proposed escalators since that particular section of the mall was built on caissons over Scajaquada Creek. Additionally, a portion of the multi-level parking ramp near the Bon-Ton store was demolished to make way for new store fronts that would create a boulevard-like design along the mall's western facade. A five-storey, 1,200-vehicle parking ramp was also built to replace the spaces affected by the expansion.

2010s
A new decade brought many changes to the now 21-year-old shopping center. In 2011, Anthropologie, a trendy women's clothing and accessory store joined the mall. A wave of other stores opened that year as well including Fossil, which opened its second area location in a  space on the first floor, Free People, a Philadelphia-based retailer which opened its first Upstate New York location in a  space on the first floor, and White House/Black Market whose  store is its second area location. Gordon Biersch, a brew pub opened in the restaurant outparcel attached to the parking garage.

In 2013, several aesthetic upgrades were made throughout the mall. New Italian marble floors were installed. Lighting and seating updates were made as well. The main entrances were updated to reflect the 2007 expansion.

In November 2014, the mall was involved in a controversy regarding stores being fined for deciding not to open on Thanksgiving Day. The mall owners threatened to fine stores $200 an hour if they remain closed on the holiday.

Around this time World of Beer opened which buoyed off of the craft beer boom happening in the Buffalo area. About a month later in September, Dave and Buster's relocated to the center in a  space next to the Cheesecake Factory.

In April 2018, Spanish retailer Zara opened a two-story  space next to H&M and Gap. In June, Macy's opened a  furniture store in the location that also formerly hosted the same concept under its predecessor, Kaufmann's.

In late 2019, Macy's announced that their location was among the first to receive millions of dollars in cosmetic upgrades. Regal Cinemas also announced upgrades which saw it bring 4-DX technology that immerses people in movies with moving seats, wind, rain, lights and even smells.

2020s
On August 27, 2020, Lord & Taylor announced they would shutter their brick-and-mortar fleet after modernizing into a digital collective department store. Early plans envision the  store reconstructed into a modern space known as York Factory, a co-working sub-brand offering soft amenities such as a program delivering lunch straight to your office, bike rentals, a physical and mental wellness studio, salon services, and weekly events.

By the 2020s, Walden Galleria's lineup of premier tenants has kept it a prominent regional destination in the Buffalo-Niagara territory. In January 2022, Walden Galleria's newest additions include Ardene, Offline by Aerie, Earthbound Trading Co., the Lego Store, Lovesac, Rue 21, Bravo! Italian Kitchen, Mandati Jewelers, Santora's Pizza Pub and Grille, and Urban Air Adventure Park.

In 2021, Walden Galleria was listed among the top 20 most visited shopping centers in America attracting over 23 million visitors from the United States and Canada.

References

External links

Walden Galleria Review

The Pyramid Companies
Shopping malls established in 1989
1989 establishments in New York (state)
Shopping malls in New York (state)
Tourist attractions in Erie County, New York
Buildings and structures in Erie County, New York